Barbadineh (also Romanized as Bārbādīneh) is a village in Sadat Rural District, in the Central District of Lali County, Khuzestan Province, Iran. At the 2006 census, its population was 54, in 10 families.

References 

Populated places in Lali County